Sheryl Spalding (October 19, 1948) is a Republican former member of the Kansas House of Representatives, who represented the 29th district. In 2012, redistricting placed her in the 8th district instead; she ran for election from that seat,but was defeated by Craig McPherson in the 2012 primary election.

Prior to her election, Spalding worked as a news journalist, and math teacher, and is now an education researcher at the University of Kansas.  She received her bachelor's degree in Secondary Education from the University of Cincinnati.

Spalding has served as President of the Blue Valley Board of Education, special advocate for the Johnson County Court, regional VP for the Kansas Association of School Boards, and regional representative for the Kansas Association of School Board Legislative Committee.

Committee membership
 Education
 Corrections and Juvenile Justice
 Government Efficiency and Fiscal Oversight

Major donors
The top five donors to Spalding's 2008 campaign:
1. Kansas National Education Assoc. $750
2. Kansans for Lifesaving Cures $750
3. Kansas Medical Society $750
4. Heart PAC $500
5. Peterson, Mr. John $500

References

External links
 Official website
 Kansas Legislature - Sheryl Spalding
 Project Vote Smart profile
 Kansas Votes profile
 State Surge - Legislative and voting track record
 Follow the Money campaign contributions:
 2006, 2008

Republican Party members of the Kansas House of Representatives
Living people
Women state legislators in Kansas
University of Cincinnati alumni
1948 births
21st-century American women politicians
21st-century American politicians